Arthur Burns is professor of modern British history and  from 2014 to 2017 was Vice-Dean (Education) in the Faculty of Arts and Humanities at King's College London. In 2017 he was appointed academic director of the Georgian Papers Programme at King's. Burns specialises in the history of English religion since the mid-eighteenth century, and particularly the history of the Church of England. Burns co-founded and co-edits the Boydell and Brewer monograph series Studies in Modern British Religious History. He received his undergraduate degree and doctorate from Balliol College, Oxford. He is a fellow of the Royal Historical Society,  and from 2012 to 2016 was its Vice President (Education), overseeing policy on the teaching of History in both schools and universities; he previously served as one of its Literary Directors. In 2016 he was appointed President of the Church of England Record Society, and was awarded an honorary fellowship of the Historical Association in 2015. 

Burns was responsible for the development of the Clergy of the Church of England Database.

Selected publications
The Diocesan Revival in the Church of England, c. 1800–1870 (Oxford University Press, 1999).
(Edited with Joanna Innes) Rethinking the Age of Reform: Britain, 1780–1850 (Cambridge University Press, 2003).
(Edited with Derek Keene and Andrew Saint) St Paul’s: The Cathedral Church of London, 604–2004 (Yale University Press, 2004; awarded 2004 Berger prize for British Art History).
"Beyond the 'Red Vicar': Christian Socialism and Community in Thaxted, Essex, c. 1910–84", History Workshop Journal (2013).
(Edited with Paul Readman and Chad Bryant) Walking Histories 1800–1914 (Basingstoke: Palgrave Macmillan, 2016).

References

External links 
Clergy of the Church of England Database.
Georgian Papers Programme

Academics of King's College London
Year of birth missing (living people)
Living people
History of the Church of England
Alumni of Balliol College, Oxford
Fellows of the Royal Historical Society